General Golovin may refer to:

Avtonom Golovin (1667–1720), Imperial Russian Army general
Fyodor Alexeyevich Golovin (1650–1706), Imperial Russian Army general
Nikolai Golovin (1875–1944), Imperial Russian Army general
Yevgeny Golovin (1782–1858), Imperial Russian Army general